Gundu Sudarshan (born Surampudi Sudarshan Rao) is an Indian comedian and actor who works in Telugu films. He acted in more than 350 films. He also has stage experience from the age of 10. He entered the film industry with Mister Pellam in 1993 directed by Bapu

Early life 
He was born to Subbarao and Kanakalatha and brought up in Bhimavaram, West Godavari district of Andhra Pradesh, India. His father was an advocate. He used to watch mythological dramas from his childhood. Till seventh standard, he studied in Manchili, his grandfather's village. He had stage experience from the age of 10. He started his acting career in his 7th standard in a stage play called Mondi Guruvu Banda Sishyudu, playing the role of Sishya (disciple). He was also involved in the cultural activities in his school. He did his schooling and intermediate in Bhimavaram.

Though he occasionally participated in stage plays, he concentrated more on studies. He completed BTech in Civil Engineering from Allahabad, Uttar Pradesh and his MTech from Regional Engineering College, Allahabad. He holds a master's degree, and PhD in Civil Engineering from Jawaharlal Nehru Technological University, Hyderabad. He also has a degree in Psychology. He worked as a lecturer in SRKR Engineering college, Bhimavaram before turning into full-time actor.

Career
He had a good rapport with writer Sriramana who is famous for his novel Mithunam, and through him, was introduced to Bapu. Bapu offered him a role of Pinni Gari Mogudu in a comedy serial Navvite Navvandi. Another Tollywood comedian, Amanchi Venkata Subrahmanyam, also was introduced to acting with this serial. He played the role of Chandamarkulu, guru of Prahlada in Bhagavatam television serial directed by Bapu and broadcast by ETV.

He made his debut as an actor in the biographic film of a great Telugu poet Srinatha called Srinatha Kavi Sarvabhowmudu (1991), directed by Bapu and starring N. T. Rama Rao. He played the role of Ganapati, the chief cook of Srinatha, in this film. It was a full-length role along with N. T. Rama Rao. But the first film released was Mister Pellam in which he played two roles – Narada and Narasaiah (neighbor of Rajendra Prasad). His dialogue Antha Vishnu Maya became popular with audiences. After that he acted in the films Rambantu, Chitram, Ramasakkanodu. He then had to go back to Bhimavaram to work as a lecturer and support his family. He continued acting in movies whenever Bapu offers him a role in his films. He used to travel to Hyderabad, finish his schedule and come back to his native for doing his regular job.

After 5 years, he moved to Hyderabad to do PhD from J.N.T.U. This also gave him a chance to concentrate more on films. His second innings started with the film Chitram directed by Teja. He hosted the TV show Chittam Chittam Prayaschittam as Chitragupta telecast by ZeeTV Telugu. He led the show for 40 episodes and also wrote the script for it. He was also one of the guests of the show Bhale Chance le hosted by Suma on MAA TV. He also appeared in the show Nuvvu Nenu, hosted by Udaya Bhanu.

Personal life 
He is married to Vijayalakshmi. She did her M.A. in Sociology. They have two children, Siva Sarath, and Hemasree Latha.

Filmography 

 Mister Pellam (1993)
 Srinatha Kavi Sarvabhowmudu (1993)
 Student No.1 (2001)
 Kabaddi Kabaddi (2003)
 Itlu Sravani Subramanyam (2001)
 Chiru Navvutho (2000)
 Athadu (2005)
 Ela Cheppanu (2003)
 Andhrudu (2004)
 Malleeswari (2004)
 Desamuduru (2007)
 Dongala Bandi (2008)
 Khaleja (2010)
 Subhapradam (2010)
 Aayudham (2003)
 Maya Bazar (2006)
 Samanyudu (2006)
 Alasyam Amrutham (2010)
 Nachav Alludu
 Genius (2012)
 Solo (2011)
 Bhimavaram Bullodu (2014)
 Naa Rakumarudu (2014)
 Manam (2014)
 Namo Venkatesa (2010)
 Loukyam (2014)
 Soukhyam (2015)
 Ganga Putrulu
 Money Money, More Money (2011)
 Naa Manasukemaindi
 Prema Kavali (2011)
 Race (2013)
 Chandamama Kathalu (2014)
 Soggade Chinni Nayana (2016)
 Supreme (2016)
 Eedo Rakam Aado Rakam (2016)
 Dictator (2016)
 Guntur Talkies (2016)
 "Om Namo Venkatesaya"" (2017)
 Samanthakamani (2017)
 C/O Surya (2017)
 Crazy Crazy Feeling (2019)
  90ML  (2019)
 Mathu Vadalara (2019)
 F3 (2022)
 Happy Birthday (2022)

References

External links
 

Telugu comedians
Telugu male actors
Living people
Year of birth missing (living people)
People from West Godavari district
Male actors in Telugu cinema
Male actors in Telugu television
Indian male actors
Indian male film actors
21st-century Indian male actors
Male actors from Andhra Pradesh